(born as Asaeli Valu) is a Tongan-born, Japanese international rugby union player who plays as a prop.

International

After 4 Top League seasons for Panasonic Wild Knights Ai Valu received his first call-up to his adopted country, Japan's senior squad ahead of the 2017 end-of-year rugby union internationals.

Personal life
Valu received Japanese Citizenship in 2017. He is the son of former rugby union player Fakahau Valu, who represented Tonga at the 1987 Rugby World Cup.

In Valu's university times, during the rugby off-season, he worked part-time at a farm-house and appeared at the Nippon Television variety show The! Tetsuwan! DASH!!.

Upon acquiring Japanese citizenship, he added the first kanji of his wife's name to his Japanese name. His wife's great-uncle is the comedian Kinichi Hagimoto. Although Valu himself has not met Hagimoto, he has been received with a phone call.

References

External links
 

1989 births
Living people
Japanese rugby union players
Tongan rugby union players
Japan international rugby union players
Rugby union props
Saitama Wild Knights players
Tongan expatriate sportspeople in Japan
Sunwolves players
Expatriate rugby union players in Japan
Tongan emigrants to Japan
Tongan expatriate rugby union players